The Madeira Football Association (Associação de Futebol da Madeira, abrv. AF Madeira) is the regional governing body for the all football competitions in the former Portuguese district of Funchal, including both Madeira Island and Porto Santo Island. It is also the regulator of the clubs registered in the autonomous region.

Notable clubs affiliated to AF Madeira 

Primeira Liga (tier 1)
 Marítimo

LigaPro (tier 2)
Nacional

Campeonato de Portugal (tier 4)
Camacha
Machico
Marítimo B

Current Divisions - 2022–23 season

The AF Madeira runs the following divisions covering the fifth and sixth tiers of the Portuguese football league system.

Divisão de Honra
1º Maio Funchal
Andorinha
Câmara de Lobos
Caniçal
Cruzado Canicense
Estrela da Calheta
Juventude de Gaula
Nacional B
Pontassolense
Portosantense
Porto da Cruz
Ribeira Brava

1ª Divisão
Carvalheiro
Choupana
Os Xavelhas
Ribeira Brava B
Santacruzense
Santana
São Vicente
União da Bola

Cup Competitions

Supertaça da Madeira

Source:

Titles
 Marítimo - 35
 União da Madeira - 16
 Nacional da Madeira - 8
 Portosantense - 7
 Santacruzense - 6
 Caniçal - 4
 Pontassolense - 4
 Câmara de Lobos - 3
 Santana - 3
 Machico - 2
 Ribeira Brava - 2
 Cruzado Canicense - 2
 Camacha - 1
 São Vicente - 1
 1º de Maio - 1
 Choupana - 1
 Estrela da Calheta - 1
 Andorinha - 1
 União da Madeira B - 1
 Porto Moniz - 1
 Xavelhas - 1

Taça da Madeira 

Titles
 Marítimo - 25
 União da Madeira - 17
 Nacional da Madeira - 6
 Camacha - 5
 Câmara de Lobos - 4
 Portosantense - 3
 Machico - 2
 Pontassolense - 2
 Marítimo C - 1
 Andorinha - 1
 Ribeira Brava - 1
 São Vicente - 1
 Bairro da Argentina - 1
 Cruzado Canicense - 1
 AD Porto da Cruz - 1

See also
Portuguese District Football Associations
Portuguese football competitions
List of football clubs in Portugal

References

External links
https://www.thefinalball.com/edicao.php?id_edicao=127859
http://www.zerozero.pt/associacao.php?id=20

Sport in Madeira
Madeira